Randolph Peter Best (né Scanland; born 24 November 1941) is an English musician known as the drummer of the English rock band the Beatles who was dismissed immediately prior to the band achieving worldwide fame. Fired from the group in 1962 after playing drums as a Beatle for the previous two years in Germany and England, he started his own band, the Pete Best Four. He later joined and started many bands over the years. He is one of several people who have been referred to as a fifth Beatle.

Best's mother, Mona Best (1924–1988), opened the Casbah Coffee Club in the cellar of the Bests' house in Liverpool. The Beatles (at the time known as the Quarrymen) played some of their first concerts at the club. The Beatles invited Best to join the band on 12 August 1960, on the eve of the group's first Hamburg season of club dates. Ringo Starr eventually replaced Best on 16 August 1962 when the group's manager, Brian Epstein, fired Best at the request of John Lennon, Paul McCartney, and George Harrison following the band's first recording session. Over 30 years later, Best received a major monetary payout for his work with the Beatles after the release of their 1995 compilation of their early recordings on Anthology 1; Best played the drums on ten of the album's tracks, including the Decca auditions.

After working in several commercially unsuccessful groups, Best gave up being in the music industry to work as a civil servant for 20 years before starting the Pete Best Band.

Early life 

Best's mother, Mona Best, was born in Delhi, India, the daughter of Thomas (a major from Ireland) and Mary Shaw. Pete Best, her first child, was born on 24 November 1941 in Madras, then part of British India. Best's biological father was marine engineer Donald Peter Scanland, who subsequently died during World War II. Best's mother was training to become a doctor in the service of the Red Cross when she met Johnny Best, who came from a family of sports promoters in Liverpool who ran Liverpool Stadium, a boxing arena. During World War II, Johnny Best was a commissioned officer serving as a Physical Training Instructor in India, and was the Army's middleweight boxing champion. Soon after their marriage on 7 March 1944 at St Thomas's Cathedral, Bombay, Rory Best was born. In 1945, the Best family sailed for four weeks to Liverpool on the Georgic, the last troop ship to leave India, carrying single and married soldiers who had previously been a part of General Sir William Slim's forces in south-east Asia. The ship docked in Liverpool on 25 December 1945.

Best's family lived for a short time at the family home, "Ellerslie" in West Derby until Best's mother fell out with her sister-in-law, Edna, who resented her brother's choice of wife. The family then moved to a small flat on Cases Street, Liverpool, but Mona Best was always looking for a large house—as she had been used to in India—instead of one of the smaller semi-detached houses prevalent in the area. The Bests moved to 17 Queenscourt Road in 1948 and remained there for nine years.

Best passed the eleven plus exam at Blackmoor Park primary school in West Derby, and was studying at the Liverpool Collegiate Grammar School in Shaw Street when he decided he wanted to be in a music group. Mona bought him a drum kit from Blackler's music store and Best formed his own band, the Black Jacks. 

In 1957, Rory Best saw a large Victorian house for sale at 8 Hayman's Green and told Mona about it. The Best family claim that Mona had pawned all her jewelry to place a bet on Never Say Die, a horse that was ridden by Lester Piggott in the 1954 Epsom Derby; it won at 33–1 and she saved her winnings and in 1957 used them to buy the house. The house, built around 1860, had previously been owned by the West Derby Conservative Club and was unlike many other family houses in Liverpool as it was set back from the road and had 15 bedrooms and an acre of land. All the rooms were painted dark green or brown, and the large garden was totally overgrown. Mona later opened The Casbah Coffee Club in the house’s large cellar. The idea for the club first came from Best, as he asked his mother for somewhere his friends could meet and listen to the popular music of the day. As The Quarrymen, John Lennon, Paul McCartney, George Harrison, and Ken Brown played at the club after helping Mona to finish painting the walls. Chas Newby and Bill Barlow joined the Black Jacks, as did Ken Brown, but only after he had left the Quarrymen. The Black Jacks later became the resident group at the Casbah, after the Quarrymen cancelled their residency because of an argument about money.

During 1960, Neil Aspinall became good friends with the young Best and subsequently rented a room in the Bests' house. During one of the extended business trips of Best's stepfather, Aspinall became romantically involved with Mona and in 1962 a son, Vincent Roag Best, was born to Aspinall and Mona. Aspinall later became the Beatles' road manager, and denied the story for years before publicly admitting that Roag was indeed his son.

The Beatles 

In 1960, the Beatles' manager Allan Williams arranged a season of bookings in Hamburg, beginning on 17 August 1960, but complained the group did not impress him and hoped that he could find a better act.

Having no permanent drummer, Paul McCartney looked for someone to fill the Hamburg position. Best had been seen playing in the Casbah with his own group, the Black Jacks, and it was observed that he played the bass drum on all four beats in the bar, which pushed the rhythm. In Liverpool, his female fans knew him as being "mean, moody, and magnificent", which convinced McCartney he would be good for the group. After the Black Jacks broke up, McCartney persuaded Best to go to Hamburg with the band, by saying they would each earn £15 per week (equivalent to £ in ). As Best had passed his school exams (unlike Lennon, McCartney and Harrison, who had failed most of theirs), he had the chance to attend teacher-training college, but he decided that playing in Hamburg would be a better career move. Best had an audition in the Jacaranda Club, which Williams owned, and travelled to Hamburg the next day. Williams later said that the audition with Best was unnecessary, as the group had not found any other drummer willing to travel to Hamburg, but did not tell Best in case he asked for more money.

On their first trip to Hamburg, the group soon realised that the stage suits they wore could not stand up to the hours of sweating and jumping about on stage every night, so they all bought leather jackets, jeans and cowboy boots, which were much tougher. Best initially preferred to play in cooler short sleeves on stage, and so did not match the sartorial style of the group, even though he was later photographed wearing a leather jacket and jeans. Lennon, McCartney, Harrison and Stuart Sutcliffe were introduced to recreational drugs in Hamburg. As they played for hours every night, they often took Preludin to keep themselves awake, which they received from German customers or Astrid Kirchherr, whose mother bought them. Lennon often took four or five but Best always refused.

The Beatles first played a full show with Best on 17 August 1960 at the Indra Club in Hamburg, and the group slept in the Bambi Kino cinema in a small, dirty room with bunk beds, a cold and noisy former storeroom directly behind the screen. Upon first seeing the Indra, where they were booked to play, Best remembered it as a depressing place patronised by a few tourists, and having heavy, old, red curtains that made it seem shabby compared to the larger Kaiserkeller. As Best had been the only group member to study O-Level German at school, he could converse with the club's owner, Bruno Koschmider, and the clientele. After the Indra closed following complaints about the noise, the group started a residency in the Kaiserkeller.

In October 1960, the group left Koschmider's club to work at the Top Ten Club, which Peter Eckhorn ran, as he offered the group more money and a slightly better place to sleep. In doing so they broke their contract with Koschmider. When Best and McCartney returned to the Bambi Kino to retrieve their belongings they found it in almost total darkness. As a snub to Koschmider, McCartney found a condom, attached it to a nail on the concrete wall of the room, and set it alight. There was no real damage done, but Koschmider reported them both for attempted arson. Best and McCartney spent three hours in a local prison and were subsequently deported on 30 November 1960, as was George Harrison, for working under the legal age limit.

Back in Liverpool, the group members had no contact with each other for two weeks, but Best and his mother made numerous phone calls to Hamburg to recover the group's equipment In late 1961 Mona arranged all the bookings for the group in Liverpool after they parted company with Williams.

Chas Newby, the ex-Black Jacks guitarist, was invited to play bass for four concerts, as bassist Stuart Sutcliffe had decided to stay in Hamburg. Newby played with the group at Litherland Town Hall and at the Casbah. He was shocked at the vast improvement in their playing and singing, and remembered Best's drumming to be very powerful, which pushed the group to play harder and louder. It was probably thanks to McCartney that Best developed a loud drumming style, as he often told Best in Hamburg to "crank it up" (play as loud as possible). When the group returned to Hamburg, by which time McCartney had switched to bass, Best was asked to sing a speciality number written by McCartney, "Pinwheel Twist", while McCartney played drums, but he always felt uncomfortable being at the front of the stage.

"My Bonnie" 

The reunited Beatles returned to Hamburg in April 1961. While they played at the Top Ten Club, singer Tony Sheridan recruited them to act as his backing band on a recording for the German Polydor label, produced by bandleader Bert Kaempfert, who signed the group to a Polydor contract at the first session on 22 June 1961. On 31 October 1961, Polydor released the recording "My Bonnie" (Mein Herz ist bei dir nur / My heart is only for you) which appeared on the German charts under the name "Tony Sheridan and the Beat Brothers"—a generic name used for whoever happened to be in Sheridan's backup band. The song was later released in the UK. There was a second recording session on 23 June that year, and a third in May 1962.

Decca and Parlophone 

Brian Epstein, who had been unofficially managing the Beatles for less than a month, arranged a recording audition at Decca Records in London on New Year's Day, 1962. The group recorded 15 songs, mostly cover versions with three Lennon–McCartney songs. Best also recorded the song "Going Back Manchester" with Lennon at this time, which would later feature as a bonus track on the special edition of his album Best of the Beatles, the rights of the song belonging to Best due to a legal technicality. A month later, Decca informed Epstein the group had been rejected. All the band members were informed of the rejection except for Best. Epstein officially became the manager of the Beatles on 24 January 1962 with the contract signed in Best's house.

Epstein negotiated ownership of the Decca audition tape, which was then transferred to an acetate disc, to promote the band to other record companies in London. In the meantime, Epstein negotiated the release of the Beatles from their recording contract with Bert Kaempfert and Polydor Records in Germany, which expired on 22 June 1962. As a part of this contract, the Beatles recorded at Polydor's Studio Rahlstedt on 24 May 1962 in Hamburg as a sessions band, backing Tony Sheridan. 
The record producer at EMI, George Martin, met with Epstein on 9 May 1962 at the Abbey Road studios, and was impressed with his enthusiasm. He agreed to sign the Beatles on a recording contract, based on listening to the Decca audition tape, without having met them or having seen them perform live. Soon after the recording contract was signed, the Beatles performed a "commercial test" (i.e. an evaluation of a signed artist) on 6 June 1962 in Studio Two at the Abbey Road studios. The Beatles were not new to studio recording and Best's drumming had been found acceptable by Polydor in Hamburg, but Martin was alerted to Best's unsuitability for British studio work. EMI engineer Norman Smith stated in a 2006 video interview that "it was mainly down to what he was playing and not how he was playing," when "Love Me Do" was first recorded, referring to the head arrangement. Martin however found Best's timing inadequate and wanted to replace Best with an experienced studio session drummer for the recordings, a common practice at the time. 
Martin stated years later:

Dismissal 
When Lennon, McCartney, and Harrison learned that Martin and the engineers preferred replacing Best with a session drummer for their upcoming recording session on 4 September 1962, they considered dismissing Best from the group. Eventually, they asked Epstein to dismiss Best from the band. Epstein agonised over the decision. As he wrote in his autobiography, A Cellarful of Noise, he "wasn't sure" about Martin's assessment of Best's drumming and "was not anxious to change the membership of the Beatles at a time when they were developing as personalities … I asked the Beatles to leave the group as it was". Epstein also asked Liverpool DJ Bob Wooler, who knew the Beatles intimately for advice, to which Wooler replied that it was not a good idea, as Best was very popular with the fans. Part of the dilemma for Epstein that arose at that time (when the band had not yet achieved national success, but rather local status as a good band with limited income), was that Best was an asset at gigs, popular with the girl fans, and put on a good show, ensuring venues would have a solid audience. The counter-argument, however, was the larger consideration of the band's having the best music producible for record sales. John, Paul and George ultimately decided that record production was more important than having a drummer for live stage performances who was more image than substance. In the meantime, Epstein refrained from telling Best that EMI had made a recording contract with the band (orally since June and in writing at the end of July 1962) which meant that a new drummer was now inevitable. There might have been legal issues had Best known.

Epstein decided that "If the group was to remain happy, Pete Best must go." Epstein summoned Best to his office and dismissed him on Thursday, 16 August, ten weeks and a day after the first recording session. Best played his last two gigs with the Beatles on 15 August at the Cavern Club, Liverpool. He was due to play his last show on 16 August at the Riverpark Ballroom, Chester, but never turned up; Johnny Hutchinson of the Big Three was rushed in as a substitute. 

Best has said he saw the Beatles after his dismissal but "we never acknowledged each other or exchanged a word."

Mersey Beat magazine's editor, Bill Harry, claimed that Epstein initially offered the vacant drummer position in the group to Hutchinson, whom he also managed. Hutchinson is said to have refused the job, saying, "Pete Best is a very good friend of mine. I couldn't do the dirty on him." However, McCartney and Harrison have said they wanted Ringo from the beginning after he sat in with them at shows on several occasions when Best was absent. Best says that Epstein revealed at the dismissal meeting that Ringo would become the new drummer.

Best had been good friends with Neil Aspinall since 1961, when Aspinall had rented a room in the house where Best lived with his parents. While still part of the group, Best had asked Aspinall to become the band's road manager and personal assistant. Aspinall accepted the job and bought an old Commer van for £80 (equivalent to £ in ). Aspinall was waiting for Best downstairs in Epstein's NEMS record shop after the dismissal meeting. The two went to the Grapes pub on Mathew Street, the same street as the Cavern Club, where the group had played. Aspinall was furious at the news, insisting to Best that he would resign from the Beatles. Best strongly advised him to remain with the group. Aspinall's relationship with Mona Best (and their three-week-old baby, Roag) was ended. At the next concert Aspinall asked Lennon why they had fired Best, to which he replied "It's got nothing to do with you, you're only the driver."

Starr had previously played with Rory Storm and the Hurricanes – the alternating band at the Kaiserkeller – and had been deputised whenever Best was ill or unable to play in Hamburg and Liverpool. Bill Harry reported Best's dismissal on the front page of Mersey Beat magazine, upsetting many Beatles fans. The group encountered some jeering and heckling in the street and on stage for weeks afterwards, with some fans shouting, "Pete forever, Ringo never!" One agitated fan headbutted Harrison in The Cavern, giving him a black eye.

As Best's replacement, Starr accompanied the band on their second recording session with EMI at Abbey Road studios on 4 September 1962. George Martin initially refused to let Starr play, in that he was unfamiliar with Starr, and wanted to avoid any risk of his drumming not being up to par. On 11 September 1962, at the third EMI recording session, Martin used session musician Andy White on the drums for the whole session instead of Starr, as Martin had already booked White after the first session with Best. Starr played tambourine on some songs, while White played drums. Starr told biographer Hunter Davies years later that he had thought, "That's the end. They're pulling a Pete Best on me."

Reasons for dismissal

Drumming ability 

According to Best, Brian Epstein told him he was "not a good enough drummer" and "Ringo [Starr] was the better drummer." The other Beatles – as well as producers, musicians, and critics who had heard Best play with the group – confirmed this reasoning.

John Lennon said that Best was recruited only because they needed a drummer to go to Hamburg. "We were pretty sick of Pete Best, too, because he was a lousy drummer, you know? He never improved, you know? ... And we were always going to dump him when we could find a decent drummer" ... "By the time we'd rolled back from Germany we'd trained him to keep a, you know, a stick to keep going up and down at four in the bar; he couldn't do much else." 

Paul McCartney stated that Best was "good, but a bit limited." McCartney remembered:

McCartney later suggested Ringo's drumming was a significant improvement over Best's.

George Harrison, too, recalled preferring Ringo's drumming. He said, "Ringo kept sitting in with the band. And every time Ringo sat in with the band, it just seemed like, this was it."

Starr, for his part, said, "I felt I was a much better drummer than [Best] was." 

Critic Richie Unterberger described Best's drumming at the Decca audition as "thinly textured and rather unimaginative", adding that Best "pushes the beat a little too fast for comfort". Unterberger thought Starr to be "more talented". Mike Savage, the session engineer, said, "I thought Pete Best was very average and didn't keep good time. You could pick up a better drummer in any pub in London. If you've got a quarter of the group being very average, that isn't good. The drummer should be the rock. If the rock isn't good, you start thinking, no. If Decca was going to sign the Beatles, we wouldn't have used Pete Best on the record." Beatles' historian Ian MacDonald, recounting the Decca audition, said that "Best's limitations as a drummer are nakedly apparent". MacDonald notes, of the EMI recording session on 6 June that "this audition version [of "Love Me Do"] shows one of the reasons why Best was sacked: in moving to the ride cymbal for the first middle eight, he slows down and the group falters." Beatles' critic Alan W. Pollack compared the Best, Starr, and Andy White versions of "Love Me Do", and concluded that Best was "an incredibly unsteady and tasteless drummer" on his version. 

Tony Sheridan, a rock and roll singer who had previously used the Beatles as a backing band, said, "The producer [Bert Kaempfert] didn't think Pete's drumming was good enough for recording. Kaempfert suggested Pete not play his bass drum because he used to get too fast; the tempo was a problem ... Pete was a crap drummer. You can take my word for it. He was just not competent. There were discrepancies between his feet and his hands."

After the Beatles signed a contract, EMI producer Ron Richards said, "Pete Best wasn't very good. It was me who said to [producer] George Martin he's useless. We've got to change this drummer." Martin, for his part, said, "[Best] couldn't play drums very well. I mean he couldn't keep time too well. And I was aware that the band weren't tight. They needed that sort of binding force that a good drummer should give them. So I said to [Beatles manager] Brian [Epstein] I'll get another drummer for the recording session."

Still, Martin claimed to be surprised to learn that Best had been fired from stage shows, hearing the news from Mona via telephone. He said:

According to biographer Bob Spitz, "All Pete could do was play Fours", a style of drumming that uses kick drum notes on every quarter note to hold down the beat. Spitz's book also contains an account by engineer Ron Richards of his failed attempts to teach Best somewhat more complicated beats for different songs.

Despite this evidence, Best said he did not believe this was the "real reason" and that it "never held up water."

In 1968, authorised Beatles biographer Hunter Davies opined that the firing of Best was "one of the few murky incidents in the Beatles' history. There was something sneaky about the way it was done." Over twenty years later, Mark Lewisohn concluded that "Despite his alleged shortcomings, it was still shabby treatment for Pete... The Beatles had had two years in which to dismiss him but hadn't done so, and now – as they were beginning to reap the rewards for their long, hard slog, with money rolling in and an EMI contract secured – he was out. It was the most underhanded, unfortunate and unforgivable chapter in the Beatles' rise to monumental power."

Band chemistry

Epstein claimed in his autobiography that Lennon, McCartney and Harrison thought that Best was "too conventional to be a Beatle" and added that "though he was friendly with John, he was not liked by George and Paul". It has been documented, in Cynthia Lennon's book John and elsewhere, that while Lennon, McCartney and Harrison usually spent their offstage time together in Hamburg and Liverpool, writing songs or socialising, Best generally went off alone. This left Best on the outside, as he was not privy to many of the group's experiences, references, and in-jokes.

A German photographer, Astrid Kirchherr, asked if they would not mind letting her take photographs of them in a photo session, which impressed them, as other groups only had snapshots taken by friends. The next morning Kirchherr took photographs on the Heiligengeistfeld, a municipal event area close to the Reeperbahn. In the afternoon, Kirchherr took them to her mother's house in Altona – minus Best, who decided not to attend. Dot Rhone, McCartney's then-girlfriend who later visited Hamburg, described Best as being very quiet and never taking part in conversations with the group.

It has been claimed that Epstein became exasperated with Best's refusal to adopt the mop-top-style Beatle haircut as part of their unified look, as he preferred to keep his quiffed hairstyle, though Best later stated that he was never asked to change his hairstyle. In a 1995 BBC Radio Merseyside interview, Kirchherr explained: "My boyfriend, Klaus Voormann, had this hairstyle, and Stuart [Sutcliffe] liked it very, very much. He was the first one who really got the nerve to get the Brylcreem out of his hair, and asking me to cut his hair for him. Pete Best has really curly hair, and it wouldn't work."

McCartney explained why Geoff Britton, one-time drummer in his subsequent band Wings, "didn't last long" in that group: "It's like in the Beatles, we had Pete Best. He was a really good drummer, but there just was something, he wasn't quite like the rest of us, we had like a sense of humour in common and he was nearly in with it all, but it's a fine line, you know, as to what is exactly in and what is nearly in. So he left the band and we were looking for someone who would fit." He told Mark Lewisohn, similarly, that when George Martin suggested "changing" their drummer the Beatles responded: "Well, we're quite happy with him, he works great in the clubs", but also that "Pete had never quite been like the rest of us. We were the wacky trio and Pete was perhaps a little more sensible; he was slightly different from us, he wasn't quite as artsy as we were."

Harrison said that "Pete kept being sick and not showing up for gigs" and admitted, "I was quite responsible for stirring things up. I conspired to get Ringo in for good; I talked to Paul and John until they came round to the idea."

Difficulties between Mona Best and others 
Before Epstein took the Beatles on, Mona had been handling most of the management and promotional work. According to promoter and manager Joe Flannery, Mona had done a great deal for the band by arranging a number of important early gigs and lending them a badly needed helping hand when they returned from Hamburg the first time, but this came at the cost of having to contend with her overbearing nature. At this crucial time in the history of the Beatles, Lennon confided to Flannery that he considered Mona "bossy like [his aunt] Mimi" and believed that she was using the Beatles only for the sake of her son Pete, though this should be weighed against the fact that the Beatles' cordial relations with Mona soon resumed. She often met them while visiting Neil Aspinall at his London home. On these occasions, the Beatles often had small gifts for her which they had acquired on their travels. For her part, Mona allowed them to use her father's military medals in the photo shoot for the Sgt. Pepper album cover.

Although Epstein's publicly stated reluctance to fire Best quickly became a matter of record in the early biographies, he had found Mona to be the cause of mounting aggravation. Epstein's distaste for her interference in the Beatles' management, including her "aggressive opinions about his handling of her son's career", was obvious to everyone, and he also reportedly considered Mona a loose cannon who must not be allowed to interfere in his operations. Moreover, the very recent birth of her son Roag further complicated matters. Although Best himself was not personally responsible for this development, it may have still caused a scandal, at a crucial moment in the Beatles' career, had it become generally known, and Epstein may have been horrified at the prospect.

Popularity 

Best's popularity with fans was reportedly a source of friction, as many female fans considered him to be the band's best-looking member. Radio Merseyside presenter Spencer Leigh wrote a book chronicling Best's firing, suggesting that the other members, McCartney in particular, were jealous. In an issue of Bill Harry's Mersey Beat music publication in Liverpool, dated 31 August 1961, Bob Wooler reported on the Beatles' local musical impact and singled out Best for special praise, calling the group "musically authoritative and physically magnetic, example the mean, moody magnificence of drummer Pete Best – a sort of teenage Jeff Chandler". During the Teenagers' Turn showcase in Manchester, Lennon, McCartney and Harrison walked on stage to applause, but when Best walked on, the girls screamed. Afterwards, attentive female fans surrounded Best at the stage door, while the other members were ignored after signing a few autographs. McCartney's father, Jim McCartney, was present at the time and admonished Best: "Why did you have to attract all the attention? Why didn't you call the other lads back? I think that was very selfish of you." Lennon called the accusations of jealousy a "myth".

In 1963 on British television, Mona, with Pete present, said of his dismissal:

Mona: "From the point of clash of personalities, well, probably that may be it because Peter did have a terrific fan club, you know, compared to the others."

[Interviewer: Too good looking perhaps?] 

Mona: "I'll leave that for other people to say but from my point of view we haven't come here to sort of throw sticks and stones at the boys because there is no really hard feeling. There was at first, but it's just the way that it was done that has annoyed us. If it had been done a bit more straightforward it would have been more to the mark."

After the Beatles 

Lennon, McCartney, and Harrison all later stated that they regretted the manner in which Best was sacked. Lennon admitted that "we were cowards when we sacked him. We made Brian do it." McCartney stated: "I do feel sorry for him, because of what he could have been on to." Harrison said: "We weren't very good at telling Pete he had to go", and "historically, it may look like we did something nasty to Pete and it may have been that we could have handled it better." Starr, on the other hand, feels he has no apology to make: "I never felt sorry… I was not involved."

Soon after Best was dismissed, Epstein attempted to console him by offering to build another group around him, but Best refused the offer. Feeling let down and depressed, he sat at home for two weeks, not wanting to face anybody or answer the inevitable questions about why he had been sacked. Epstein secretly arranged with his booking agent partner, Joe Flannery, for Best to join Lee Curtis and the All-Stars, which broke off from Curtis to become Pete Best & the All Stars. They signed to Decca Records, releasing the single "I'm Gonna Knock On Your Door", which was not successful.

The Pete Best Combo  

Best later moved to the United States along with songwriters Wayne Bickerton and Tony Waddington. As the Pete Best Four, and later as the Pete Best Combo (a quintet), they toured the United States with a combination of 1950s songs and original tunes, recording for small labels, but they had little success. They ultimately released an album on Savage Records, Best of the Beatles; a play on Best's name, leading to disappointment for record buyers who neglected to read the song titles on the front cover and expected a Beatles compilation. The group disbanded shortly afterwards. Bickerton and Waddington were to find greater success as songwriters in the 1960s and 1970s, writing a series of hits for the American female group the Flirtations and the British group the Rubettes. In 2000, the record label Cherry Red reissued the Pete Best Combo's recordings as a compact disc compilation. Richie Unterberger, reviewing the CD, stated that the music's "energy level is reasonably high," that Bickerton and Waddington's songwriting is "kind of catchy," and that Best's drumming is "ordinary."

American garage rock band Lyres recorded a cover version of Pete Best Combo's "The Way I Feel About You" on their 1984 album On Fyre.

Later years 

Best decided to leave show business, and by the time of Hunter Davies' authorised Beatles biography in 1968, he was not willing to talk about his Beatles association. Years later he stated in his autobiography, "the Beatles themselves certainly never held out a helping hand and only contributed to the destruction with their readily printed gossip that I had never really been a Beatle, that I didn't smile, that I was unsociable and definitely not a good mixer. There was not a single friendly word from any one of them". This culminated in a Beatles' interview published in Playboy magazine in February 1965 in which Lennon stated that "Ringo used to fill in sometimes if our drummer was ill. With his periodic illness." Starr added: "He took little pills to make him ill." Best sued the Beatles for defamation of character, eventually winning an out-of-court settlement for much less than the $18 million he had sought.

Davies recalled that while working with the Beatles on their authorised biography in 1968, "when the subject of Pete Best came up they seemed to cut off, as if he had never touched their lives. They showed little reaction ... I suppose it reminded them not just that they had been rather sneaky in the handling of Pete Best's sacking, never telling him to his face, but that for the grace of God, or Brian Epstein, circumstances might have been different and they could have ended up [like Pete]." Best attempted suicide in the 1960’s, but his mother, Mona, and his brother, Rory, prevented him from completing it.

In 1963, Best married Kathy, a Woolworth's sales clerk whom he met at an early Beatles show; they have remained married and have two daughters and four grandchildren. Best did shift work loading bread into the back of delivery vans, earning £8 a week (equivalent to £ in ). His education qualifications subsequently helped him become a civil servant working at the Garston Jobcentre in Liverpool, where he rose from employment officer to training manager for the Northwest of England, and remembered "a steady stream of real-life Yosser Hughes types" imploring him to give them jobs. The most he could do, he recalls, was to offer to retrain them in other fields, "which was an emotional issue for people who had done one kind of work all their lives."

Eventually, Best began giving interviews to the media, writing about his time with the group and serving as a technical advisor for the television film Birth of the Beatles. He found a modicum of independent fame, and has admitted to being a fan of his former band's music and owning their records. In 1995, the surviving Beatles released Anthology 1, which featured a number of tracks with Best as drummer, including songs from the Decca and Parlophone auditions. Best received a substantial windfall – between £1 million and £4 million – from the sales, although he was not interviewed for the book or the documentaries. According to writer Philip Norman, the first time Best knew about the royalties due him for the use of those tracks "was a phone call" from Paul McCartney himself, "the one who'd been so keen to get rid of him" – the first time they'd spoken since it happened. "Some wrongs need to be righted," Paul told him. "There's some money here that's owing to you and you can take it or leave it." Best took it. However, Best asserts that it was Neil Aspinall and not McCartney who phoned him. “Paul McCartney claims he called me but he didn’t,” Best told The Irish Times.

The collage of torn photographs on the Anthology 1 album cover includes an early group photo that featured Best, but Best's head was removed, revealing a photo of Starr's head, taken from the Please Please Me cover photo (the missing section of the photograph appears on the cover of the album Haymans Green). A small photograph of Best can be seen on the left side of the Anthology cover. Best appeared in an advertisement for Carlsberg lager that was broadcast during the first commercial break of the first episode of the Anthology TV series on ITV in November 1995. The tag line was "Probably the Pete Best lager in the world", a variation of Carlsberg's well-known slogan.

The Pete Best Band 

In 1988, after twenty years of turning down all requests to play drums in public, Best finally relented, appearing at a Beatles convention in Liverpool. He and his brother Roag performed, and afterwards his wife and mother both told him, "You don't know it, but you're going to go back into show business." Best now regularly tours the world with the Pete Best Band, sharing the drumming with his younger brother Roag. The Pete Best Band's album Haymans Green, made entirely from original material, was released on 16 September 2008 in the US, 24 October 2008 worldwide, excluding the UK, and 27 October 2008 in the UK.

Honours 

On 6 July 2007, Best was inducted into the All You Need Is Liverpool Music Hall of Fame as the debut Charter Member. Best was presented with a framed certificate before his band performed. Liverpool further honoured Best with the announcement, on 25 July 2011, that two new streets in the city would be named Pete Best Drive and Casbah Close.

Portrayals in media

Film and television
Best is portrayed in several films about the Beatles. In the 1979 biopic Birth of the Beatles, for which Best was a technical advisor, he is played by Ryan Michael. In both the 1994 film Backbeat and in the 2000 television biopic In His Life: The John Lennon Story, Best is played by Liverpool native Scot Williams. The 2008 Rainn Wilson film The Rocker, about a drummer kicked out of a glam metal band through no fault of his own, was inspired by Best's termination. Best had a cameo in the movie. In 2021, filming began on Midas Man which is about the life of Brian Epstein; Best is played by Adam Lawrence.

Theatre
BEST!, a comedy play written by Liverpool playwright Fred Lawless, was staged at the Liverpool Everyman Theatre and the Dublin Theatre Festival in 1995 and 1996. The play, which was mainly fiction, showed a scenario where after Pete Best's sacking, he went on to become a world-famous rock superstar while his ex-group struggled as one hit wonders. The play was critically acclaimed in both the Liverpool Echo and also in Spencer Leigh's 1998 book Drummed Out: The Sacking of Pete Best.
Pete Best is a main character in David Harrower's 2001 play Presence, premiered at the Royal Court Theatre, London, dramatising The Beatles' time in Hamburg.

Wirral actor, Andrew Games, portrayed Pete Best in BestBeat at the Unity Theatre, Liverpool; it documented Best's time with The Beatles from 1960 to 1962.

Discography

Albums 

 Best of the Beatles (Savage BM 71, Released: 1965)
 Includes: "I Need Your Lovin"; "Just Wait and See"; "Casting My Spell"; "Keys to My Heart"; "Why Did You Leave Me Baby?"; "Like My Sister Kate"; "I Can't Do Without You Now"; "I'm Blue"; "Some Other Guy"; "She's Alright"; "Nobody But You"; "Last Night"; Special Edition includes bonus tracks "Need You"; "Going Back Manchester"
 The Beatle That Time Forgot [Original Version] (Phoenix PB-22, Released: 1981)
 Includes: "I'm Checking Out Now Baby"; "I'll Try Any Way"; "I Don't Know Why (I Just Do)"; "How'd You Get to Know Her Name"; "She's Not the Only Girl in Town"; "If You Can't Get Her"; "More Than I Need My Self"; "I'll Have Everything Too"; "The Way I feel About You"; "Don't Play With Me (Little Girl)"; "Rock and Roll Music"; "All Aboard"
 Rebirth (Phoenix PB-44, Released: 1981)
 Includes: "I Can't Do Without You Now"; "Off the Hook"; "She's Alright"; "I Need Your Lovin'"; "Why Did You Leave Me Baby"; "High School Shimmy"; "I Wanna Be There"; "Everybody"; "Pete's Theme"; "Keys to My Heart"
 The Beatle That Time Forgot [Reissue] (Phoenix PHX 340, Released: 1982)
 Includes: "I'll Try Anyway"; "I Don't Know Why I Do (I Just Do)"; "She's Not the Only Girl in Town"; "More Than I Need My Self"; "I'll Have Everything Too"; "I'm Checking Out Now Baby"; "How'd You Get to Know Her Name"; "If You Can't Get Her"; "Rock and Roll Music"
 Back to the Beat – (1995)
 The Pete Best Combo: Beyond the Beatles 1964–1966 (1 February 1996)
 Live at the Adelphi Liverpool 1988 – (23 September 1996)
 Best (18 August 1998)
 Casbah Coffee Club 40th Anniversary Limited Edition (1999)
 The Savage Young Beatles (10 May 2004)
 Haymans Green – Released 16 September 2008 (US), August 2008 (UK) (The Pete Best Band)

Singles 

 "I'm Gonna Knock on Your Door" b/w "Why Did I Fall in Love with You" (Decca F 11929, Released: 1964)
 "Don't Play With Me (Little Girl)" b/w "If You Can't Get Her" (Happening 405, Released: 1965)
 "If You Can't Get Her" b/w "The Way I Feel About You" (Happening HA1117, Released: 1965)
 "Kansas City" b/w "Boys" (Cameo 391, Released: 1965)
 "(I'll Try) Anyway" b/w "I Wanna Be There" (Original Beatles Drummer 800, Released: 1965)
 "I Can't Do Without You Now" b/w "Keys to My Heart" (Mr. Maestro Records 711, Released: 1965)

Another "Peter Best" single, "Carousel of Love"/"Want You" (1967 – Capitol / P 2092) is not by Best, but an Australian performer with the same name.

Notes

References

Further reading

External links 

 
 
 Complete Pete Best Discography
 Pete Best interview from NPR Fresh Air program
 Pete Best Interview NAMM Oral History Library (2018)
 

1941 births
English rock drummers
Living people
Musicians from Chennai
Musicians from Liverpool
People educated at Liverpool Collegiate Institution
The Beatles members
English expatriates in the United States
English people of Irish descent
People from West Derby
Beat musicians